"The Cage" is the first pilot episode of the American television series Star Trek. It was completed on January 22, 1965 (with a copyright date of 1964). The episode was written by Gene Roddenberry and directed by Robert Butler. It was rejected by NBC in February 1965, and the network ordered another pilot episode, which became "Where No Man Has Gone Before". Much of the original footage from "The Cage" was later incorporated into the season 1 two-parter episode "The Menagerie" (1966); however, "The Cage" was first released to the public on VHS in 1986, with a special introduction by Gene Roddenberry, and was not broadcast on television in its complete form until 1988. The black and white version and shorter all-color version was also released in various standard-definition media including LaserDisc, VHS, and DVD formats.

The story concerns a starship crew's investigation of a far off planet which was the site of a shipwreck eighteen years earlier and their encounter with telepathic aliens who seek a human male specimen for their menagerie. The pilot introduced Mr. Spock, played by Leonard Nimoy, who was the only cast member to be retained for the series in their original role.

Overview
"The Cage" has many of the features of the eventual series, but there are numerous differences. The captain of the starship USS Enterprise is not James T. Kirk, but Christopher Pike. Spock is present, but not as first officer. That role is taken by a character known only as Number One, played by Majel Barrett. Spock's character differs somewhat from that seen in the rest of Star Trek; he displays a youthful eagerness that contrasts with the later more reserved and logical Spock. He also delivers the first line in all of Star Trek: "Check the circuit!" followed by, "Can't be the screen then." The weaponry used in the pilot also differs from that seen in the series proper, identified as lasers rather than phasers, and different props are used for the communicator and handheld weapons.  

NBC reportedly called the pilot "too cerebral", "too intellectual", and "too slow" with "not enough action". Rather than rejecting the series outright, though, the network commissioned a second pilot, "Where No Man Has Gone Before", which led to an order for the series for fall 1966.

Footage repurpose for series 
During the first season, the need for new episodes to be delivered to the network to meet airdates became urgent, and a framing story with the series regulars was written around most of the original footage from "The Cage" resulting in the two-part episode "The Menagerie".

The process of editing the pilot into "The Menagerie" disassembled the original camera negative of "The Cage", and thus, for many years it was considered partly lost. Roddenberry's black-and-white 16mm print made for reference purposes was the only existing print of the show, and was frequently shown at conventions. Early video releases of "The Cage" used Roddenberry's 16mm print, intercut with the color scenes from "The Cage" that were used in "The Menagerie". It was only in 1987 that a film archivist found an unmarked (mute) 35mm reel in a Hollywood film laboratory with the negative trims of the unused scenes. Upon realizing what he had found, he arranged for the return of the footage to Roddenberry's company.

According to "The Menagerie", the events of "The Cage" take place thirteen years before the first season of Star Trek, in 2254. No stardate was given.

Plot
The USS Enterprise, under the command of Captain Christopher Pike, receives a radio distress call from the fourth planet in the Talos star group. A landing party is assembled and beamed down to investigate. Tracking the distress signal to its source, the landing party discovers a camp of survivors from a scientific expedition that has been missing for eighteen years. Amongst the survivors is a beautiful young woman named Vina.

Captivated by her beauty, Pike is caught off guard and is captured by the Talosians, a race of humanoids with bulbous heads who live beneath the planet's surface. It is revealed that the distress call, and the crash survivors, except for Vina, are just illusions created by the Talosians to lure the Enterprise to the planet. While imprisoned, Pike uncovers the Talosians' plans to repopulate their ravaged planet using him and Vina as breeding stock for a race of slaves.

The Talosians use their power of illusion to try to interest Pike in Vina, and present her in various guises and settings, first as a Rigellian princess, a loving compassionate farm girl, then a seductive, green-skinned Orion. Pike resists all forms. After an earlier landing party failed to gain entry from the surface, six members of the Enterprise crew prepare to beam into the Talosians' underground complex, but only Pike's first officer and yeoman—both women—materialize in Pike's cell to offer further temptation. By then, however, Pike has discovered that primitive human emotions can block the Talosians' ability to read his mind, and he manages to escape to the surface of the planet along with the two members of his landing party.

The Talosians confront Pike and his companions before they can transport back to the Enterprise. The captain tries to negotiate, but the first officer sets her weapon on a buildup to overload. Pike and Vina move closer to her, agreeing with her preference for death rather than captivity. After all, as Vina explains, if the Talosians have even one human being, they might try again. This demonstration of fatal resolve confirms what the Talosians have been gleaning from the records they've accessed from the Enterprise's computers: The human race despises captivity far too much to be useful.

Despite their last hope having been proven unsuitable, the Talosians are not vengeful. They let the humans go. The first officer and yeoman beam up immediately, but Pike remains behind with Vina, urging her to leave with him. Vina explains that she cannot leave. An expedition had indeed crash-landed on Talos IV; Vina was the sole survivor, but was badly injured. The Talosians were able to save her, but as they had no understanding of human physiology or aesthetics at the time, she was left horribly disfigured. With the aid of the Talosians' illusions, she is able to appear beautiful and in good health, as much to herself as to any others.

Realizing that the continued Talosian illusion of health and beauty is necessary for Vina, Pike is ready to return to the Enterprise without her. In an act of goodwill, the aliens show him that Vina sees an image of Pike next to her, and they walk up to the entrance that takes them into the Talosian habitat. Pike then beams up after the Keeper's closing words: "She has an illusion and you have reality. May you find your way as pleasant."

Primary cast
Jeffrey Hunter as Captain Christopher Pike
Leonard Nimoy as Mr. Spock
Majel Barrett as Number One
John Hoyt as Dr. Philip Boyce
Susan Oliver as Vina

Casting
Jeffrey Hunter had a six-month exclusive option for the role of Captain Pike. Although he was required to continue if the series was picked up by the network in that time, he was not required to film the second pilot that NBC requested. Deciding to concentrate on motion pictures instead, he declined the role. Gene Roddenberry wrote to him on April 5, 1965:

Two weeks after the option expired on June 1, 1965, Hunter formally gave his letter requesting separation from the project. He died on May 27, 1969, one week before the original series ended its run. Roddenberry later suggested that he was the one who—unhappy with interference by Hunter's then-wife Dusty Bartlett—had decided not to rehire Hunter; however, executive producer Herbert F. Solow, who was present when Bartlett, acting as manager, refused the role on behalf of her husband, later said in his memoir, Inside Star Trek, that it was the other way around.

Production
"The Cage" was filmed at Desilu Productions' studio (now known as Culver Studios) in Culver City, California, from November 27 to mid-December 1964. Post-production work (pick-up shots, editing, scoring, special photographic and sound effects) continued to January 18, 1965.

Gene Roddenberry paid a lot of attention to what The Outer Limits team was doing at the time, and he was often present in their studios. He hired several Outer Limits alumni, among them Robert Justman and Wah Chang, for the production of Star Trek. One of the creatures in the cages was reused from the episode "The Duplicate Man" of The Outer Limits, where it was called a megasoid. The prop head from The Outer Limits episode "Fun and Games" was used to make a Talosian appear as a vicious creature. The process used to make pointed ears for David McCallum in "The Sixth Finger" was reused in Star Trek as well. The "ion storm" seen in "The Mutant" (a projector beam shining through a container holding glitter in liquid suspension) became the transporter effect.

The Talosians were portrayed by women, with their telepathic voices recorded by male actors. This was done to give the impression that the Talosians had focused their efforts on mental development to the detriment of their physical strength and size, and also to give that much more of an alien feel to the Talosians. However, the deep voice of Malachi Throne as the Keeper in "The Cage" was electronically processed to sound higher-pitched for "The Menagerie", as Throne also portrayed Commodore Mendez in the latter. The Keeper's voice from "The Menagerie" was kept for both the remastered and new "original" versions of "The Cage" which would be released later. Throne's unaltered voice work as The Keeper only survives as a brief sample that can be found in the preview trailer for "The Menagerie" (Part II).

Releases and availability 
"The Cage" was first released on VHS in 1986, with a special introduction by Roddenberry, and was aired for the first time in its entirety, and in full color, in late November 1988 as part of The Star Trek Saga: From One Generation to the Next, a two-hour retrospective special hosted by Patrick Stewart. 

Although most of this episode was edited into the original series episode "The Menagerie" (aired November 1966), no stand-alone version of "The Cage" pilot was available until a 1986 VHS release. Gene Roddenberry had in his possession a black-white film workprint version on 16 mm film, while the original 35 mm print was literally cut up in editing for "The Menagerie"; this left Roddenberry's copy as the only known surviving version when the VHS version was made. Thus, the original VHS release has a mix of full-color from existing footage with black-and-white from the 16 mm copy.

In 1987 the edited film sections were discovered and it became possible to complete a full-color version. The restored color version was broadcast in October 1988, which was the first television airing of "The Cage". It was broadcast as part of a television special hosted by Patrick Stewart called The Star Trek Saga: From One Generation to the Next.It contained interviews with Gene Roddenberry, Maurice Hurley, Rick Berman, Mel Harris, cast members from Star Trek and Star Trek: The Next Generation, clips from both series and the Star Trek films I through IV with a small preview of Star Trek V. It was later rebroadcast on UPN in 1996 with a behind the scenes look at Star Trek: First Contact.

"The Cage" was released on LaserDisc in the United States; this version mixed B&W and color footage with a runtime of 73 minutes. On October 10, 1990 a Collector's Edition of "The Cage" with a runtime of 64 minutes featuring all-color footage was released on LaserDisc in the US.

Two VHS versions were released in the United Kingdom with one being the restored color version.

"The Cage" was released on PAL-format LaserDisc in the United Kingdom as part of The Pilots collection, in April 1996. This included the color version of "The Cage", "Where No Man Has Gone Before", "Encounter at Farpoint", "Emissary", and "Caretaker" with a total runtime of 379 minutes.

Both versions of "The Cage" were included on the original series Season 3 DVD box set, along with the introduction by Roddenberry.

The original pilot episode "The Cage" is sometimes listed as episode 99. On the VHS home video releases, it was identified as Episode 1.

Reception 
In 2010, SciFiNow ranked this the third best episode of the original series.

In 2016, SyFy ranked "The Cage" as the fifth best out of six Star Trek TV show pilots, with Star Trek: Deep Space Nine'''s "Emissary" in first place.

In 2017, Inverse recommended "The Cage" as "essential watching" for Star Trek: Discovery. 

In 2023, Den of Geek ranked "The Cage" as the best pilot episode for any series in the franchise.

 Follow-up and spin-off 
In 2019, the Star Trek: Discovery episode "If Memory Serves" saw Pike and Spock (roles re-cast) return to Talos IV; the recap at the beginning of the episode used scenes from "The Cage".

CBS All Access officially ordered Star Trek: Strange New Worlds to series in May 2020 featuring the characters of Captain Pike, Number One, and Spock. At 55 years between The Cage and the announcement of Strange New Worlds, Co-Showrunner and Executive Producer Henry Alonso Myers calls this the longest pilot to series pick up in television history.

See also

List of Star Trek episodesStar Trek: Strange New Worlds, the 2022 television series based on The Cage''.

References

External links

"The Cage" Script Review
"The Cage" Outlining of the history and of the differences of the story evolution
"The Cage" Review of the remastered version at TrekMovie.com

1965 American television episodes
1986 American television episodes
Television pilots within series
Fiction set around Rigel
Star Trek: The Original Series episodes
Television episodes about simulated reality
Television episodes about slavery
Television episodes written by Gene Roddenberry